The women's 10,000 metres at the 2017 World Championships in Athletics was held at the London Stadium on 5 August.

Summary
2015 champion Vivian Cheruiyot from Kenya was absent, having retired from track races. Three-time world champion Tirunesh Dibaba from Ethiopia ran, although she had planned initially to run the marathon instead. Almaz Ayana, also from Ethiopia and the world record holder from the 2016 Summer Olympics, ran her first race of the year.

The race began at a leisurely pace, with Ayana hovering near the front, just behind a succession of leaders. After 4000 metres in just over 13 minutes, Ayana led by 0.24 seconds. She then broke open the race with a 2:49.18 1000 metres, which was her quickest of the race, and extended her lead to 5.96 seconds at the halfway mark, with Yasemin Can from Turkey in second place. Her lead at 6000 metres grew to 16.84 seconds. Her 46:37 second margin of victory was the largest ever in a women's 10,000 metres at the World Championships. Her final 5000 meters was run in 14:24.94, which only seven women had bettered in a 5000 metres race.

The race for the silver medal was competitive among Dibaba, Alice Aprot Nawowuna, and Agnes Jebet Tirop. Dibaba, however, ran a fast 2:49.98 last 1000 metres, averaging 68 seconds per 400 metres, to clinch the silver.

Records
Before the competition, the records were as follows:

The following records were set in the race:

Qualification standard
The standard to qualify automatically for entry was 32:15.00.

Results
The final took place on 5 August. The results were as follows(photo finish):

Split times
The split times of the top four finishers were as follows:

References

10,000
10,000 metres at the World Athletics Championships
Women's sport in London